During the 2005–06 season, the Scottish football club :Gretna F.C. became champions of the :Scottish Second Division. The team also reached the final of the Scottish Cup, the biggest match of their history losing on penalties to Hearts.

Results

Scottish Second Division

Final Table

Scottish League Cup

Scottish Challenge Cup

Scottish Cup

References

Gretna F.C. seasons
Gretna